The 2007 Istanbul Park GP2 Series round was a GP2 Series motor race held on August 25 and 26, 2007 at Istanbul Park in Istanbul, Turkey. It was the eighth round of the 2007 GP2 Series season. The race weekend supported the 2007 Turkish Grand Prix.

Classification

Qualifying

Feature race

Sprint race

References

Istanbul Park
GP2
Auto races in Turkey
August 2007 sports events in Turkey